Henri-Guillaume Schlesinger, originally Wilhelm Heinrich Schlesinger (6 August 1814, in Frankfurt am Main – 21 February 1893, in Neuilly-sur-Seine) was a French portrait and genre painter of German birth. He was especially known for his lively and sensitive depictions of young women.

Biography
He studied painting at the Academy of Fine Arts, Vienna, and was originally active in that city. He then moved to Paris, where he participated in the Salon from 1840 to 1889 and received two medals. 

During a visit to Istanbul in 1837, he was commissioned to do several official paintings of Sultan Mahmud II, including a large equestrian portrait and one of the Sultan wearing Western-style clothing, which is now on display at the Topkapi Palace Museum. One was donated to King Louis-Philippe by Mustafa Reşid Pasha, who was then serving as Ambassador to France, and may now be seen at Versailles.

His painting "The Five Senses" was purchased by Empress Eugénie in 1865. The following year, he was named a Chevalier in the Legion of Honor and became a French citizen in 1870, just before the outbreak of the Franco-Prussian War. During the war and the subsequent Commune, he lived in London.

In addition to oil paintings, he was a watercolorist and painted miniatures on ivory.

Works

References

Further reading 
 Schlesinger, Heinrich. In: Ulrich Thieme, Felix Becker (editors): Allgemeines Lexikon der Bildenden Künstler von der Antike bis zur Gegenwart. Vol. 30, E. A. Seemann, Leipzig 1936, pg. 105.
 Schlesinger, Heinrich. In: Allgemeines Künstlerlexikon. Die Bildenden Künstler aller Zeiten und Völker (AKL). Vol. 9, Saur, Munich, 1994, pg. 8

External links 

More works by Schlesinger @ ArtNet
Brief biography @ Wilnitsky Fine Arts
Brief biography @ Galerie Ary Jan

1814 births
1893 deaths
French portrait painters
French genre painters
German emigrants to France
Artists from Frankfurt
Painters at the court of the Ottoman Empire